Yu Dong-ju (born August 19, 1993) is a South Korean male weightlifter, competing in the 85 kg category and representing South Korea at international competitions. He participated in the men's 85 kg event at the 2015 World Championships and at the 2016 Summer Olympics, finishing in fourteenth position.

Major results

References

External links 
 

1993 births
Living people
South Korean male weightlifters
Place of birth missing (living people)
Weightlifters at the 2016 Summer Olympics
Olympic weightlifters of South Korea
Weightlifters at the 2020 Summer Olympics
World Weightlifting Championships medalists
20th-century South Korean people
21st-century South Korean people